Zoltán Kovács (born 1969) is a Hungarian historian and politician, who currently serves as Secretary of State for Public Diplomacy and Relations in the second, third, and fourth governments of Prime Minister Viktor Orbán. He opposes the European Union's relocation scheme, which seeks to share migrants, following the European migrant crisis, between member states according to quotas.

References

External links
Kormany.hu életrajz

1969 births
Living people
21st-century Hungarian historians
People from Abaújszántó
Members of the National Assembly of Hungary (2022–2026)